Cheilosia vicina is a hoverfly species found in the Palearctic.

Description
External images
For terms see Morphology of Diptera
Wing length 5·25-7 ·75 mm. Wings slightly infuscated. Legs entirely black. Posterior and anterior anepisternum dusted. Arista short-haired. Face with central knob retroussé. A member of the 
antiqua species group and difficult to determine.

Distribution
A Palearctic species with a limited distribution in Europe (Europe, except the Mediterranean, to Western Siberia)

Biology
Habitat: Dune systems, unimproved pasture, montane grassland and alpine grassland and clearings in deciduous forest. Flowers visited include white umbellifers Caltha, Cirsium arvense, Leontodon, Leucanthemum, Menyanthes, Prunus spinosa, Ranunculus, Salix, Senecio, Taraxacum.Flies April to October.

References

Eristalinae
Diptera of Europe
Insects described in 1849